Abigail Elizabeth Good (born 30 September 1971) is an English former runway model, now working as travel writer and international Children’s fashion photographer, photojournalist and set photographer working under the name Abi Campbell.

Good was born in Leicester, and raised in Singapore. She returned to England as a teenager, and went to school in Bromsgrove.  After modelling for some ten years, she was selected by Stanley Kubrick to play the role of the "Mysterious Woman" in his 1999 film Eyes Wide Shut. She was the last actress Stanley Kubrick filmed. 

The role of the Mysterious Woman appeared to be combined in some fashion with that of Mandy (portrayed by Julienne Davis), a prostitute with whom the Cruise character has a brief connection.  The apparent doubling led to confusion and some controversy.

Good also appeared as Tabatha in Randall's Flat cast as a forthright,  manipulative woman with striking good looks, and another role as a "mysterious blonde" in the 2002 film Butterfly Man.

Good lives with her two children in London, England.

Filmography

References

External links

English film actresses
English female models
Living people
People educated at Bromsgrove School
1971 births
Fashion photographers
English travel writers
British women travel writers